David Athelstan Bedford (29 August 1926 – 25 April 2017) was an Australian rules footballer who played with Melbourne in the Victorian Football League (VFL).

Notes

External links 

1926 births
Royal Australian Navy personnel of World War II
Australian rules footballers from Victoria (Australia)
Melbourne Football Club players
2017 deaths
Royal Australian Navy sailors